The British Rail Class 156 Super Sprinter is a diesel multiple unit passenger train. A total of 114 sets were built between 1987 and 1989 for British Rail by Metro-Cammell's Washwood Heath works. They were built to replace elderly first-generation DMUs and locomotive-hauled passenger trains.

Background
By the beginning of the 1980s, British Rail (BR) operated a large fleet of  first generation DMUs, which had been constructed in prior decades to various designs. While formulating its long-term strategy for this sector of its operations, British Rail planners recognised that there would be considerable costs incurred by undertaking refurbishment programmes necessary for the continued use of these ageing multiple units. Planners instead examined the prospects for the development and introduction of a new generation of DMUs to succeed the first generation.

This specification led to the experimental British Rail Class 210 DMU. However, it was found to be expensive, and it was recognised that a production model assembled from proven components would possess greater reliability and lower maintenance costs; an availability rate of 85 percent was forecast.

By 1983, experiences with the Class 210 had influenced BR planners to favour procuring a new generation of DMUs, but to also adopt a new specification that were somewhat less demanding than before. The requests for compatibility with other rolling stock were eliminated, although auto-coupling and auto-connecting functionality was added.

The bid submitted by British Rail Engineering Limited (BREL) was heavily based on its successful Class 455 EMU, sharing its body and the majority of its running gear, albeit equipped with two different power trains.

The resulting Class 150 was viewed as unsatisfactory for more-upmarket services. Studies showed coaches could be stretched, providing more internal volume and thus enabling the somewhat cramped two-by-three seating arrangement of the Class 150 to be substituted with a more roomy two-by-two counterpart. These changes could be implemented without impacting much of the benefits of adopting the existing design.

It was identified that this would result in a weight increase and thus a decreased power-to-weight ratio, but it was determined that the performance of the proposed DMU was only slightly lower, and it could achieve similar journey times across the intended cross-country routes as the Class 150. It was also found that, while there was a slight increase in fuel consumption due to the changes, the envisioned DMU had lower fuel consumption than locomotive-hauled trains and lower maintenance costs. Accordingly, it was decided to proceed with developing a detailed specification and issuing it to industry. Amongst the requirements listed in the issued specification was the explicit statement of the acceptability of the proven power trains of both the Class 150 and Class 151.

Description
The design of the Class 156 was relatively conservative in comparison to Metro-Cammell's earlier Class 151 design. Specific changes include the bodyshell being primarily composed of steel instead of aluminium; the deliberate decision was made to model the cab design on the earlier Class 150 was allegedly taken to ease union acceptance. Each coach is powered, being outfitted with a single six-cylinder Cummins NT855-R5 diesel engine coupled to a Voith T211r hydraulic transmission and Gmeinder final drive units. Construction of the welded bodyshells was subcontracted out; 118 by Procor Engineering of Wakefield, 60 by W.H. Davis of Mansfield, and 50 by Standard Wagon of Heywood. Aston Martin Tickford were awarded the interior fitout contract. 

The units were numbered 156401 to 156514. Each unit was formed of two powered vehicles, one of which contained a toilet. Individual vehicle are numbered as follows, where the final three digits of the vehicle number match the unit to which the vehicle belongs:
 52401–52514: Driving Motor Standard Lavatory (DMSL)
 57401–57514: Driving Motor Standard (DMS), containing an area for storing wheelchairs, bicycles, bulky luggage etc.

Unlike the Class 150 units, the 156s have a single-leaf sliding door at either end of each coach. This reflected the expected longer journeys with fewer stops that the Class 156 was supposed to operate. As with the Class 150, all the doors are operable by passengers when released by the guard using one of two passenger door control panels; they are energised using a carriage key to turn a rotary switch situated on the cab bulkhead. Units operated by Abellio ScotRail have additionally been fitted with door-control panels near the centre sets of doors for the convenience of the guard.

Nine units used by Greater Anglia were transferred to East Midlands Railway in 2019, at which point they were renumbered into the 156/9 subclass (156419 becoming 156919, and so on) to indicate that their public address and passenger information systems were incompatible with EMR's existing Class 156 units. A number of these units started to transfer to Northern Trains from December 2021 onwards, at which point they were returned to their original numbers.

Operations

British Rail

On 10 November 1987, 156401 conducted its first test run from Washwood Heath to Banbury. Between January and July 1988, 156401-156429 were delivered to Crown Point TMD entering service on 16 May 1988 on new services from East Anglia to North West England as well as existing services from Norwich and Cambridge to Birmingham. They also operated boat trains from Harwich to Blackpool and later Liverpool.

The remaining 85 were delivered to Heaton, Neville Hill, Haymarket and Inverness. With the Class 155 units withdrawn due to faulty door mechanisms, 25 were transferred to Cardiff from December 1988, with the last remaining until November 1989. In this guise they operated services as far south as Portsmouth. In May 1991, six were transferred from Crown Point to Derby Etches Park.

On 15 June 1989, 156502 was sent to the Netherlands as part of the Dutch Railways 150th anniversary celebrations. It returned on 10 July. On 21 October 1993, 156405 became the first Sprinter to accrue 1 million miles, whilst working the 10:10 Great Yarmouth to Norwich service.

The first 100 were painted in Provincial sector's livery of blue and beige with light blue stripe. Twenty units based at Tyseley depot, 156401–156419 and 156422, were later repainted into Regional Railways Express livery after the rebranding of Provincial. The last fourteen units were operated by Strathclyde PTE, and carried an orange and black livery. Following the delivery of the Class 158s in the early 1990s, the 156s began to be cascaded to less important services.

In the early 1990s, British Rail was looking to save costs on rural routes, and decided that operating two-car trains was too expensive. The company planned to convert a number of Class 156 units into single-car vehicles, named as Class 152. In the event, the decision was taken to do this with the  instead, forming the  fleet.

Post-privatisation
As part of the privatisation of British Rail, the Class 156 fleet was split and sold to Angel Trains (76 units) and Porterbrook (38), who then leased the units to a number of train operating companies.

Scotland

At privatisation the Scottish fleet passed to the National Express owned ScotRail franchise, which used them until 2004 when the franchise was taken over by First ScotRail. All passed to Abellio ScotRail with the franchise in 2015.

Units 156500–156514 were operated by Strathclyde Partnership for Transport and originally wore its orange and black livery. This was replaced with a carmine and cream livery in 1997, which was also applied to further 14 units. Despite receiving these special liveries, the SPT units were not confined to any specific route and thus worked in tandem with the rest of the Class 156 fleet on other routes. 

In September 2008 Transport Scotland announced that all ScotRail trains (including those of Strathclyde Partnership for Transport) would be repainted in a new livery of blue with white saltire markings on the carriage ends. The first unit was repainted in this livery by RailCare Springburn in February 2009.

In December 2014, unit 156478 was written off by Angel Trains and sold to Brodie Leasing after being damaged by floodwaters on the Glasgow South Western Line. Brodie Leasing repaired the unit and it returned to service with Abellio ScotRail in October 2016.

Between 2016 and 2019, all of ScotRail's Class 156 units were refurbished to make them compliant with PRM-TSI standard. This refurbishment included a larger toilet, a dedicated wheelchair area and brand new interior upholstery with new seats similar to those found on the Class 385.

In late 2018, five units transferred to Arriva Rail North after the Class 385s began to enter service.

From 2020, Scotrail's Class 156 units began operating in multiple with Class 153 units on the West Highland Line to provide upgraded seating and additional capacity for bicycles and other sporting equipment.

The ScotRail 156s currently operate the following routes:

Glasgow Central to East Kilbride
Glasgow Central to Kilmarnock/Carlisle.
Glasgow Central/Ayr to Girvan/Stranraer
Glasgow Queen Street to Anniesland
Glasgow Queen Street to Mallaig/Oban
Edinburgh Waverley to Oban (seasonal summer service)

Only the fifteen units fitted with Radio Electronic Token Block signalling equipment can operate on the West Highland Line.

East Anglia
Having originally been based in the East Anglia region but later transferred away, in early 2005 they returned when One received nine from Central Trains in exchange for a similar number of Class 150s.

The units were used on the following local services:
Bittern Line -  to  via 
Wherry Lines -  to /
East Suffolk Line -  to /
Sudbury Branch Line -  to 

All nine passed to Abellio Greater Anglia when it took over the Greater Anglia franchise in February 2012. Despite being overhauled by Railcare Wolverton in 2012/13, including work to make them comply with disability legislation, all were replaced by Class 755s with the last day of service being 29 January 2020. These then moved to East Midlands Railway, where they were renumbered into the 156/9 subclass.

Northern England

Following privatisation, both Arriva Trains Northern and First North Western operated Class 156s and implemented their own refurbishment programmes. The two fleets were united when Northern Rail took over both franchises in 2004.
Within the Northern region, Class 156s are concentrated in the North-West and also the North-East, but are uncommon now in Yorkshire and Humberside, where Class 158s and other unit types are used instead.

In 2011, fourteen Class 156s were fitted with GPS as a trial for Northern Rail, being tested on the Esk Valley line. In 2011 four were transferred to East Midlands Trains.

In January 2015, Northern Rail began to hire 156s to First TransPennine Express to operate Manchester Airport to Blackpool North services. Northern Rail's fleet of 42 Class 156s passed to Arriva Rail North when the then-new franchise started on 1 April 2016. The 156s began to operate Manchester Airport to Barrow in Furness and Oxenholme to Windermere services from this date after they along with the Manchester Airport to Blackpool North services were transferred to the franchise.

An additional five Class 156 units transferred to Northern from Abellio ScotRail in late 2018. On 1 March 2020 the Northern units were transferred to new operator Northern Trains.

Fifteen Class 156s are to be transferred from East Midlands Railway to Northern Trains. These units include the nine Class 156/9s formerly used by Greater Anglia. Some of these units are already with Northern Trains, with more due to follow. The delivery of them commenced at the December timetable change in 2021. For the December timetable change in 2022, five more units were transferred.

Midlands

In 1997, Central Trains inherited twenty units from Regional Railways for use mainly on medium-distance services such as:
Birmingham to Nottingham via Derby or Leicester
Birmingham to Hereford
Birmingham to Shrewsbury and the Cambrian Line
Nottingham to Skegness or Lincoln

In an attempt at fleet standardisation, preparations were made during 2003 to exchange all 20 Class 156s for an equal number of ScotRail Class 158s, with 156402 partially repainted in ScotRail colours in readiness when overhauled at Wabtec, Doncaster. The transfer did not proceed after the Scottish Government refused to sanction the move, and the rest of the fleet were reliveried into Central Trains' colours between 2003 and 2005.

Nine units were transferred to One during early 2005, in exchange for a similar number of Class 150s.

At the end of the Central Trains franchise, the remaining 11 units were transferred to East Midlands Trains, who repainted the fleet during 2008 and then carried out a refurbishment program from autumn 2010 onwards. The refurbishment, carried out at Neville Hill depot, included interior refurbishment work, improvements to driving cabs and installation of CCTV. These trains are now used on slower medium-distance services such as Nottingham/Derby to Matlock, Nottingham to Skegness, Leicester to Lincoln and Nottingham to Worksop. In May 2011, four additional units were transferred from Northern Rail to allow Nottingham to Liverpool services to be strengthened.

Beginning in late 2019, the nine class 156s transferred to Greater Anglia in 2005, passed to East Midlands Railway. Because they had a different public address and passenger information system to EMR's existing Class 156 fleet, they were renumbered into the 156/9 subclass.

In December 2022, four units were sent for storage at Barrow Hill, with East Midlands Railway stating that they will be moved to Ely Papworth sidings at a later date.

Fleet details

Liveries

Accidents and incidents
On 31 January 1995, in the Ais Gill accident, unit 156490 was derailed by a landslide, after which a train travelling in the opposite direction collided with it. The guard aboard 156490, Stuart Wilson, was killed.
On 6 June 2010, unit 156499 derailed and briefly caught fire after striking a rockfall near Falls of Cruachan station on the Oban branch of the West Highland Line. Eight people were injured.
On 17 August 2010, unit 156417 was involved in a collision with a slurry tanker at a user-operated level crossing in Suffolk. Twenty-one people were injured, one of them seriously.
The train had been travelling at a reduced speed of approximately  due to the risk of rockfall after heavy rain, which potentially prevented its becoming derailed.
On 21 December 2014, unit 156478 encountered floodwaters on the track near Mauchline (between Kilmarnock and Auchinleck stations). The unit was repaired and refurbished at Brodie Leasing's Kilmarnock works and returned to service in October 2016.
There were no injuries.
On 7 January 2019, unit 156479 collided with a taxi on the Tyne Valley Line between Newcastle and Carlisle. There were no injuries.

Models
Lima produced OO gauge models of Class 156 units, with sixteen variants available in total. Some of these models were subsequently relaunched by Hornby Railways in 2006. 

Realtrack Models released their own OO-gauge Class 156 models in 2017, in Regional Railways Provincial, First ScotRail, and East Midlands Trains liveries.

References

Sources

Further reading

External links

156
Metropolitan Cammell multiple units
Train-related introductions in 1988